Nahuel Ignacio Guzmán (born 10 February 1986) is an Argentine professional footballer who plays as goalkeeper for Liga MX club UANL.

Club career
Guzman made his professional debut for Newell's Old Boys in August 2006 against C.A. Belgrano. On 2008, he went on loan to Independiente Rivadavia until 2009. He became a key to the championship of Newell's in the 2013 Final Tournament.

Tigres UANL
In July 2014, he was transferred to Liga MX club Tigres UANL to play the Apertura 2014 season. Guzmán made his official debut with Tigres in a 0–0 draw against Atlas de Guadalajara at the Estadio Jalisco on 19 July. That season, Guzmán and his club made it to the finals of Liga MX against Club América. In the home leg, Tigres won by 1–0 with goal of Joffre Guerrón. In the second leg, Guzmán received a red card, as did teammates Hernán Burbano and Damián Ariel Álvarez. Tigres lost 3–0, in an overall score of 3–1.

Tigres reached to the finals of the Copa Libertadores 2015 against River Plate. After a 0–0 draw in the home leg, Tigres lost the second leg by 3–0 in Buenos Aires.

In December 2015, Guzmán and his team became champions of the Apertura 2015 season. In the first leg of the finals against Pumas UNAM, Tigres won by 3–0. In the second leg, Pumas won by 3–0. In extra time Tigres scored the 1–3 at 103' but Pumas equalized 1–4 at 119'. After an aggregate of 4–4, Tigres won via penalty shoot-out 4–2, with Guzmán stopping the fourth shot from Pumas.

A year later, Guzmán and his team faced América to become champions for the fifth time. In the first and second leg the teams tied 1–1. After an aggregate of 2–2, Tigres won via penalty shoot-out by 3–0, with Guzmán stopping all 3 penalties. Guzmán was named MVP of the second leg and named best goalkeeper of the Apertura 2016, with 9 clean sheets and impressive saves against América in the finals.

In the second leg of the Round of 16 tie in the 2020 CONCACAF Champions League against Alianza, with his team on the verge of elimination due to the away goals rule since the score was tied on aggregate, Guzmán scored a header off a free kick in the fourth minute of second half added time to give his team the victory in the tie.

International career
Guzmán was an integral part of the Argentina U-17 side in the World Cup of the category 2003. On 13 October 2014, he played 45 minutes with Argentina in the 7–0 victory against Hong Kong in a friendly match.

In May 2018 he was named in Argentina's preliminary 35-man squad for the 2018 World Cup in Russia. Guzmán was called up to the final 23-man squad after first-choice keeper Sergio Romero was ruled out through injury.

Career statistics

International
Statistics accurate as of match played 13 June 2017

Honours
Newell's Old Boys
Primera División: 2013 Final

Tigres UANL
Liga MX: Apertura 2015, Apertura 2016, Apertura 2017, Clausura 2019
Campeón de Campeones: 2016, 2017, 2018
CONCACAF Champions League: 2020
Campeones Cup: 2018

Argentina
Copa América runner-up: 2015, 2016

Individual
Liga MX Best XI: Apertura 2015, Apertura 2016, Clausura 2019
Liga MX Save of the Season: 2015–16
CONCACAF Champions League Golden Glove: 2020
CONCACAF Champions League Team of the Tournament: 2020
Liga MX All-Star: 2021

References

External links

1986 births
Living people
Association football goalkeepers
Argentine footballers
Newell's Old Boys footballers
Independiente Rivadavia footballers
Tigres UANL footballers
Liga MX players
2015 Copa América players
Copa América Centenario players
Footballers from Rosario, Santa Fe
Argentine expatriate footballers
Argentine expatriate sportspeople in Mexico
Expatriate footballers in Mexico
Argentina youth international footballers
Argentina international footballers
2018 FIFA World Cup players